Music video stations include the following:

4Music
40 TV (defunct)
ALT TV (defunct)
Aux
Black Entertainment Television (music video programming discontinued)
BET Hip-Hop
BET Jams
BET Soul
bpm:tv (defunct)
Box Hits
C4 (defunct)
Cable Music Channel (defunct)
Channel O
Channel [V] (defunct)
Channel [V] Australia (defunct)
Citra Dangdut
CMC-TV
CMT Music
Country Music Channel (defunct)
Country Music Television
Croatian Music Channel
CStar (TV channel)
CStar Hits France
D-TV on the Disney Channel (discontinued)
Fly Music (defunct)
Foxtel Smooth (defunct)
Fuse (music video programming discontinued)
Gaan Bangla 
Gospel Music Channel
Great American Country
Go TV
GTV (music video programming discontinued)
Heartland
International Music Feed (defunct)
JUCE TV (defunct)
Juice TV (defunct)
Kerrang! TV
Kiss TV
Kiss TV (Romania)
M6 Music
Magic
Max (defunct)
MAD TV 
MCM
Mnet
MTV
MTV2 (music video programming discontinued)
MTV Global
Club MTV
MTV Hits
MTV Live
MTV 80s
MTV 90s
MTV 00s
MTV Tres
MTV Classic
MTV Classic UK (defunct)
MTVU
MuchMore (defunct)
MuchMusic (music video programming discontinued)
Musimax
MusiquePlus (defunct)
Music 24 (defunct)
Music Box (defunct)
Music Box Slovakia (defunct)
Music Channel Romania
Music Choice
Music TV
Musik Indonesia
MUZU.TV (defunct) 
Myx
NME TV (defunct)
NickMusic
Now 80s
Nusantara
Persian Music Channel
PopAsia
Polsat Music
Q TV (defunct)
RadiantTV
Revolt
Ritmoson Latino
SBS M
Scuzz (defunct)
Spirit Television
Starz TV (defunct)
TeleHit
The Country Network
The Loop
The Music Factory (defunct)
Tempo TV (defunct)
The Box
The Tube Music Network (defunct)
Trace Urban
Trace Latina (defunct)
Trace Vault
theCoolTV (defunct)
TVU Music Television
UTV Romania
[V] (defunct)
Vevo
VH1 (music video programming removed)
VH1 Europe (defunct)
VH-1 Deutschland (defunct)
VH1 Poland (defunct)
VH1 Classic (defunct)
VH1 Classic Europe (defunct)
Videomusic (defunct)
VIVA (defunct)
The Worship Network (defunct)
ZUUS Country
ZU TV

Music video television
Music television channels